Frederick George Foulds (born 23 April 1935 in Leicester) is an English former cricketer. He was a right-handed batsman.

Foulds made two first-class appearances for Leicestershire against Cambridge University at Fenner's in 1952, and for Sussex at Grace Road in the 1956 County Championship. In four batting innings, he scored just a single run, was dismissed for a duck three times and finished with a batting average of 0.25.

References

External links
Fred Foulds at ESPNcricinfo
Fred Foulds at CricketArchive

1935 births
Living people
Cricketers from Leicester
English cricketers
Leicestershire cricketers